{{Album ratings
|rev1 = AllMusic
|rev1score = 
|rev2 = 'Billboard|rev2score = (?)
|rev3 = Jesus Freak Hideout|rev3score = 
}}Never Going Back to OK''' is the second album by Christian rock group The Afters, released on February 26, 2008.

The first single from the album is the title track, "Never Going Back to OK". The track has been released as a streaming file on their MySpace website and for purchase on iTunes. Since the album's release, "Keeping Me Alive" and "We Are the Sound" have both been played as singles on Christian radio. "We Are the Sound" was used in commercials and promotion of the reality-talent competition show American Idol. The song "Ocean Wide" also made an appearance on Vampire Diaries''.

Following its release, it debuted at No. 41 on the Billboard 200 chart, selling about 16,000 units in its first week.

Awards

The album won a Dove Award for Rock/Contemporary Album of the Year at the 40th GMA Dove Awards. The title song was also nominated for Rock/Contemporary Recorded Song of the Year.

Track listing

Never Going Back to OK - EP
An EP of this album has also been released exclusively to iTunes, containing three tracks:

Personnel

The Afters
Josh Havens - lead vocals, guitar
Matt Fuqua - guitar, backing vocals
Brad Wigg - guitar, bass, backing vocals
Marc Dodd - drums
Additional production
Jeremy Lutito - additional drums
Justin Sanders - cello
Chuck Butler - additional bass, additional acoustic guitar
David Davidson - strings
David Angell - strings
John Catchings - strings
Dan Muckala - producer, engineering, string arrangement
Joe Baldridge - engineering
Skye McCaskey - engineering
Josh Muckala - engineering assistant
Jess Thompson - engineering assistant
F. Reid Shippen - mixing
Ted Jensen - mastering
James Rueger - A&R
Dana Salsedo - creative direction
Esther Havens - photography
Melanie Peskett - wardrobe
Ray Medrano - grooming

References

The Afters albums
2008 albums
INO Records albums
Columbia Records albums